Mohd Hazri bin Rozali (born 26 June 1986) is a Malaysian footballer who plays as a central midfielder for Sri Pahang.

References

External links
 

1986 births
Living people
People from Pahang
Malaysian footballers
Sri Pahang FC players
Malaysia Super League players
Association football midfielders